The MacDonnells of Antrim (Gaelic: Mac Domhnaill), also known as the MacDonnells of the Glens, are a branch in Ireland of the Scottish-based Clan Donald. Initially part of Clan MacDonald of Dunnyveg (Clan Donald South), the MacDonnells of Antrim became their own branch in 1558 when Somhairle Buidhe MacDonnell obtained the lordship of the territory in Ireland from James MacDonald, 6th chief of the Clan MacDonald of Dunnyveg. The MacDonnells of Antrim were a sept of the Clan Donald of the royal Clann Somhairle, that the English crown had attempted to cultivate since the early 14th century in its efforts to influence the course of politics in Scotland. The MacDonnells established a growing presence in Ireland throughout the 15th and 16th centuries,and played a crucial role in the politics of 17th century Ireland. The MacDonnell's achieved much success in Ireland largely to cultural and familial connections to the Gaelic nobility of Ireland. Today the surname is predominantly spelled McDonnell in Ireland and abroad, although many McConnell's are also of the same family, as that is the Gaelic pronunciation of the Mac Domhnaill. Most of the leadership of the Clan wrote their name as a variant of McConnell up until the 17th Century, including Sorley Boy MacDonnell himself.  Many of the present-day McDonnell's have a common descent from Sorley Boy MacDonnell.

History

Origins
The MacDonnells of Antrim are descended from John Mor MacDonald, chief of the Clan MacDonald of Dunnyveg. John Mor MacDonald was the second son of Good John of Islay, Lord of the Isles, 6th chief of Clan Donald, through John of Islays second marriage to Princess Margaret Stewart, daughter of King Robert II of Scotland.

John Mor MacDonald married Margery Byset, daughter of the Mac Eoin Bissett, Lord of the Glens of Antrim. Although the MacDonnells would a century and a half later claim that her dowry included the lordship itself, this is false because the Mac Eoin Bissetts remained in possession of it into the early or mid 16th century. However following the death in battle, in support of his friends and kinsmen the O'Neills against the O'Donnells, of the last known Mac Eoin Bissett in 1522, the recently arrived MacDonnells appear to have started making their own gains in the region and eventually used the earlier marriage to claim they had rights to the Bissett lordship. The MacDonnells already possessed Dunnyvaig Castle on the Isle of Islay and lands in Kintyre, Scotland.

The MacDonnells of Antrim did not become a separate branch of Clan Donald until 1558, when they were part of Clan MacDonald of Dunnyveg, when Somhairle Buidhe MacDonnell obtained the lordship of the territory in Ireland from James MacDonald, 6th of Dunnyveg.

15th century
John Mor was assassinated by James Campbell in 1427. John's son Donald Balloch MacDonald, the second chief, led the clan when they fought and won at the first Battle of Inverlochy (1431). This was in support of their cousin Alexander of Islay, Earl of Ross, 3rd Lord of the Isles and 8th chief of Clan Donald. The MacDonalds were supported by the Clan Cameron. They fought against the Royal forces of the Earl of Mar who was supported by the Clan MacKintosh.

The third Chief, Sir John Mor, with his heir John Cathanach and three grandsons, were apprehended through the treachery of the Macdonald of Ardnamurchan and were executed in Edinburgh for treason. One of his sons, Alexander, fled to Ireland. MacIain of Ardnamurchan, who had also betrayed Alexander MacDonald of Lochalsh, was himself killed in 1518 by those who he had betrayed.

16th century

On the death of James MacDonald, the sixth chief of the Clan MacDonald of Dunnyveg and Antrim, the Antrim Glens were seized by one of his younger brothers, Sorley Boy MacDonnell (Somhairle Buidh:Somhairle of the yellow hair). Somhairle is best known for establishing the MacDonnell clan in Antrim and resisting the campaign of Shane O'Neill and the English crown to expel the clan from Ireland.

In 1565 under Sorley Boy MacDonnell the Clan MacDonnell of Antrim and Dunnyveg fought the Battle of Glentasie against Shane O'Neill.

In April 1583 the MacDonnells, led by Sorley Boy MacDonnell, who had been fighting in the McQuillan-O'Cahan feud on the side of the McQuillan clan decided to backstab their allies. In the ensuing battle of Aura Edward McQuillan was killed bringing about the McQuillans rule over The Route as well as their seat of Dunluce Castle.

Alaster, the eldest son of Sorley Boy was killed in 1585, his head was placed on a spike at Baile-atha-cliath (Dublin).

17th century

Randal MacDonnell was a personal friend and courtier of King Charles I. Upon the commencement of the Bishops' Wars between Charles I and the Scottish Covenanters, he offered to lead a sea-borne expedition against the Covenanter regime on behalf of King Charles. This request was granted, but in the end the plans were frustrated by the antipathy of Thomas Wentworth and the success of the Covenanters against the King.

By 1645, however, the Scottish Covenanter regime had broken their truce with King Charles by intervening in the English Civil War on the side of the English Parliament. Randall MacDonnell once again requested to assist the King by orchestrating an expedition from Ireland. This had the joint aims both of weakening the Covenanter regime on behalf of the King, and of reclaiming lands from Clan Campbell. The Catholic MacDonnells were pitted against their Campbells foes, who were at the forefront of the puritanical Protestant Covenanter regime. This time, the plans for an expedition came to fruition, with Alasdair MacColla (also known as Alexander MacDonnell) leading a force of men from Waterford to Scotland. Rallying his Clan Donald kinsmen, and joining with the Marquis of Montrose, despite being outnumbered they inflicted a series of crushing defeats on larger enemy forces.

Perhaps their crowning achievement was when, in a daring winter campaign, the Clan Donald forces undertook a surprise march through the snow-covered mountains into the Campbell heartlands of Argyll, which were considered impregnable. They then scored an overwhelming victory against the Campbell force that was arrayed against them at the battle of Inverlochy, with the chief Archibald Campbell ignominiously fleeing for his life on a barge as the men of his clan were being slaughtered in battle. Alasdair MacColla then occupied Argyll, and the chief Randall MacDonnell arrived to join him, but the successes of the Scottish campaign were to be undone by the defeat of King Charles in England. Many MacDonnell troops fell back to Ireland, where they opposed the Cromwellian invasion.

MacDonnell forces supported King James II in the Williamite War in Ireland.

Castles

Dunluce Castle was the seat of MacDonald Earl of Antrim, in Ireland.
Dunanynie Castle
Kinbane Castle
Red Bay Castle
Dunnyvaig Castle in was the Earl of Antrims seat in Scotland where he headed the Clan MacDonald of Dunnyveg

See also
Irish nobility
Lord of the Isles

Citations

References

 Chambers, Anne, At Arm's Length: Aristocrats in the Republic of Ireland. New Island Books. 2nd revised edition, 2005.
 Curley, Walter J.P., Vanishing Kingdoms: The Irish Chiefs and their Families. Dublin: Lilliput Press. 2004.
 Ellis, Peter Berresford, Erin's Blood Royal: The Gaelic Noble Dynasties of Ireland. Palgrave. Revised edition, 2002.
 O'Hart, John, Irish Pedigrees. Dublin: James Duffy and Co. 5th edition, 1892.

Sources
http://www.clandonald-heritage.com
MacDonald Family Tree

 
Irish families
Gaels